Mad God is a 2021 stop-motion adult animated experimental horror film written, produced, and directed by Phil Tippett. Completed in 2021, the film was produced over a period of thirty years. It was released on streaming service Shudder on June 16, 2022.

Plot
A tall figure shrouded in a jacket and gas mask, credited as the assassin, descends into a ruined, hellish world via a diving bell. In his possession, the assassin has a map and a suitcase.

Traveling through the underworld, the assassin encounters many creatures mercilessly preyed upon by larger monsters. Eventually, he reaches a city which is home to an army of faceless drones, apparently ruled by a monstrosity with filthy teeth and seared flesh who speaks in baby babble. Deep within the city's bowels, the assassin discovers a mountain of suitcases just like his own. The assassin opens his suitcase, revealing a timed bomb, which he places and prepares to set off. He fails to notice a creeping monster behind him, which then attacks and drags him away as the bomb's ticking hand appears unable to complete its circuit of the clock.

The assassin is shackled to a table and stripped in front of a mass of spectators. A surgeon appears with a nurse, splits open the assassin's abdomen, and begins rummaging through his chest cavity. Jewelry and papers are pulled out and thrown to the floor. Eventually, the surgeon finds his goal: a strange, infant larva-like creature that is wailing. The surgeon hands it to the nurse, who carries it away.

The surgeon bores a hole in the assassin's head and hooks his brain to a television set. As the surgeon watches the television, the world above is shown, where the last man gives a map forged by gnarled witches to an assassin and sends him down in a diving bell. Driving a motorcycle and then a jeep, the assassin follows the map through a munitions depot, a graveyard and a war zone before descending a spiral roadway.

Back in the underworld, the nurse brings the infant to a ghostly, floating creature who escorts the child to an alchemist's lair. The alchemist grinds the infant into liquid, then alchemically transforms its remains into gold. This gold is then used to create a new cosmos which undergoes the same cycle of evolution, civilization and self-destruction as the previous one. In doing so, the clock in the assassin's bomb appears to somehow restart and complete its circuit.

Production

While working on RoboCop 2, Tippett began filming what would become Mad God. His work on Jurassic Park led him to believe the days of stop-motion were over, and the film was shelved.

Twenty years later, with the encouragement of members of his studio, Tippett began working on the project again, utilizing crews of volunteers to assist him.

With aid from Kickstarter donations, Tippett was able to create the first three sections, which make up about half of the film. Tippett released a behind-the-scenes footage on YouTube during production.

In 2013, Academy Award-winning sound designer Richard Beggs agreed to do the sound design and mix for the project.

Music
The original score was composed by Dan Wool, who started work on the project in 2010 and developed score in chapters until the release in 2021. The soundtrack album, released by Waxwork Records, came out in 2022 on double-vinyl and CD

Release
Mad God premiered in 2021 at the 74th Locarno Film Festival. Shudder acquired distribution rights to the film, planning a limited release in theaters and on AMC+ on June 16, 2022.

Reception

Box office
In the United States and Canada, the film earned $8,416 from two theaters in its opening weekend. It expanded to 26 theaters in its second weekend and made $36,588. It added $24,451 in its third weekend, $37,617 in its fourth, and $16,280 in its fifth, ultimately grossing more than double its $150,000 budget in its limited theatrical release.

Critical response
On review aggregator Rotten Tomatoes, Mad God holds an approval rating of 93%, based on 80 reviews, and an average rating of 7.80/10. Its consensus reads, "A rich visual treat for film fans, Mad God proves that even in the age of CGI, the cinematic allure of stop-motion animation remains strong." On Metacritic, the film has a weighted average score of 80 out of 100, based on 14 critics, indicating "generally favorable reviews".

John Defore of The Hollywood Reporter praised the film's animation, bleak atmosphere and design, calling it "a tech achievement FX geeks will need to see", and "among the bleakest dystopias [of] science fiction". Sight and Sounds John Bleasdale offered similar praise while also criticizing its bleak setting, summarizing that the film "has all the makings of an instant cult classic". Scoring the film four out of five stars, Drew Tinnin from Dread Central praised the design, atmosphere and animation, as well as the film's soundtrack, calling it "sheer artistry coming to life".

Rafael Motamayor of IndieWire rated the film a B, writing "Mad God, a cacophony of savagery and cruelty [offering] no hope, no respite from the awe-inspiring terror." Nerdist's Kyle Anderson rated the film a score of 4.5 out of 5, offering similar praise to the film's atmosphere, visuals, bleak setting, and production design while noting the film's simplistic narrative. Reviewing for Tilt Magazine, critic Thomas O'Connor called the film "a deeply unsettling spectacle", highlighting the film as a technical achievement in stop-motion animation, as well as praising the film's bleak atmosphere and disturbing imagery.

Christopher Stewardson from Our Culture Magazine rated the film four out of five stars, commending the animation, visual design, hellish atmosphere, and dream-like quality, writing "Mad God almost has an anti-war ring to it. In its abstract madness, it presents the nightmare of what war does. Nobody is human. Only monsters exist".

The film was not without its detractors. IGNs Kristy Puchko gave a score of five out of ten, commending the atmosphere and visuals, but criticized the film for what she felt was the "lack of any real plot or substance".

Accolades

References

External links
 Mad God official website
 
 Mad God at Rotten Tomatoes 
 Mad God at Metacritic

2021 films
2021 animated films
2021 horror films
2021 science fiction films
2021 science fiction horror films
2020s American animated films
2020s stop-motion animated films
American adult animated films
American animated horror films
American animated science fantasy films
American animated science fiction films
American science fiction horror films
American dark fantasy films
Animated post-apocalyptic films
American body horror films
American splatter films
Crowdfunded films
Kickstarter-funded films
Films directed by Phil Tippett
Animated films without speech
2020s English-language films
2020s avant-garde and experimental films